Coreodrassus is a genus of Asian ground spiders that was first described by K. Y. Paik in 1984.  it contains only three species: C. forficalus, C. lancearius, and C. semidesertus.

References

Araneomorphae genera
Gnaphosidae
Spiders of Asia